Constant Marie, known as Le Père Lapurge (17 August 1838 – 5 August 1910) was a French communard, shoemaker, anarchist and poet. 
He was the author of several popular revolutionary songs.

Early years

Constant Marie was born on 27 August 1838 in Sainte-Houvrince, Calvados.
He began work as a bricklayer.  
He participated in the Paris Commune, and was wounded in the fighting at the Vanves fort.

Anarchist shoemaker and songwriter

Due to his injuries Constant Marie was forced to change occupation to become a shoemaker. He became an anarchist and began to compose revolutionary songs.
Within twelve years of the fall of the commune in 1871, Constant Marie's songs had become very popular in some circles.
Constant Marie often performed at festivities of anarchist groups.
He came to the attention of the police, who searched his house on 1 July 1894 and seized books and the texts of his songs.
He was arrested and charged with "membership of a criminal conspiracy." He spent several weeks in the Mazas Prison.
As a young man the anarchist, journalist and then Communist activist Fernand Desprès (1879–1949) worked as a shoemaker with Constant Marie.

Constant Marie died on 5 August 1910.

Works

Le Père Lapurge ("Father Purge") was published in 1886 in the Calais anarchist newspaper La Révolte des Affamés.
Constant Marie's other well-known songs included Dame dynamite and La Muse rouge. 
This last gave its name in 1901 to a famous group of revolutionary poets and singers.
By 1891 he was also known for Révolté, Jacques normand, Tocsin and Affranchie.
His songs continued to be performed in cabarets after the turn of the century.

References

Sources

1838 births
1910 deaths
French poets
French anarchists
Communards